Free were an English rock band formed in London in 1968, by vocalist Paul Rodgers, guitarist Paul Kossoff, bassist Andy Fraser and drummer Simon Kirke, the group signed with Island Records. 

The group is best known for their hit songs "All Right Now” and "Wishing Well". Free's discography consists of six studio albums, two live albums, 18 compilation albums, one EP, 16 singles and two video albums. The band released their debut album Tons of Sobs in 1969. The album entered the US Billboard 200 chart at number 197. Free's self-titled second album failed in sales and charts, before the 1970 follow-up Fire and Water peaked at number 2 on the UK Albums Chart, supported by the popular single "All Right Now" which reached the same position on the UK Singles Chart. The single also reached the top ten in a number of other regions, including the United States where it peaked at number 4 on the Billboard Hot 100.

Free's fourth album Highway reached number 41 on the UK Albums Chart, while its lead single "Stealer" charted at number 49 on the Billboard Hot 100. Free broke up in 1971 due to tensions between members of the band. In September, the group's first live album Free Live! was released, reaching number 4 on the UK Albums Chart and number 89 on the Billboard 200. The non-album single "My Brother Jake", released the same year, peaked at number 4 in the UK. Free reunited the following year, releasing Free at Last in June 1972 which reached the top ten of the UK Albums Chart. In early 1973 the band released Heartbreaker, which was recorded primarily by Rodgers and Kirke due to Fraser's departure and Kossoff's drug problems. 

The band broke up permanently later in 1973, with Rodgers and Kirke going on to form Bad Company later that year. Island issued the first Free compilation at the end of the year, The Free Story, which reached number 2 on the UK Albums Chart and was certified silver by the British Phonographic Industry (BPI). Many more compilations followed in the subsequent years, including The Best of Free: All Right Now in 1991, which reached the top ten in the UK, and Chronicles in 2005, which reached number 42 on the chart. The Very Best of Free & Bad Company Featuring Paul Rodgers, released in 2010, which also features tracks by Bad Company, peaked at number 10 on the UK Albums Chart and was certified silver by the BPI. The band reached the top ten on the UK Singles Chart again in 1991, with a remixed version of "All Right Now" which peaked at number 8.

Albums

Studio albums

Live albums

Compilations

Video albums

Extended plays

Singles

See also
List of songs recorded by Free

Notes

References

External links
Free discography at AllMusic
Free discography at Discogs
Free discography at MusicBrainz

Discography
Free
Free
Free